Atlantic was launched at Calcutta, under another name and returned to British ownership as a prize taken from the French in 1805. She made one complete voyage for Samuel Enderby & Sons as a whaler in the British southern whale fishery. She was lost late in 1807 perhaps while setting out on a second whaling voyage.

Career
Atlantic first appeared in Lloyd's Register (LR) in 1805.

Atalante', Swain, master, sailed from Portsmouth on 28 October 1805.

The British vessels dispersed and Lark, Traveller, and four of the merchantmen escaped. Traveller was among the vessels that escaped, but at the time, it was not clear what had happened to Atlantic.

On 3 May 1806 Atlantic, Swain, master, arrived at Port Jackson. She was reported to have come from England, with oil, which suggests that she had already gathered some whale oil before she arrived. She departed for the fisheries on 29 July. She apparently returned to Port Jackson on 7 November with 750 barrels of whale oil. Atlantic, Swaine, master, returned to England on 8 September 1807.

Fate
Reportedly, Atlantic'', David Kell, master, was lost in late 1807.

Citations

1800s ships
British ships built in India
Captured ships
Whaling ships